Italaque is a small town in Bolivia. The town had a population of 346 in 2012.

References

Populated places in La Paz Department (Bolivia)